In enzymology, a galactose-6-sulfurylase is an enzyme that catalyzes the chemical reaction

Eliminates sulfate from the D-galactose 6-sulfate residues of porphyran, producing 3,6-anhydrogalactose residues.

This enzyme belongs to the family of transferases, specifically those transferring aryl or alkyl groups other than methyl groups.  The systematic name of this enzyme class is D-galactose-6-sulfate:alkyltransferase (cyclizing). Other names in common use include porphyran sulfatase, galactose-6-sulfatase, and galactose 6-sulfatase.

Further reading 
 
 

EC 2.5.1
Enzymes of unknown structure